Nulli Secundus (Latin for "Second to None").

Australian Defence Force 
 Motto of Nine Squadron Royal Australian Corps of Transport (active from 1973)

Affiliates 

 Motto of 402 Squadron Watsonia of the Australian Air Force Cadets (4 Wing, Victoria)

British Armed Forces 
 Motto of the Coldstream Guards (active from 1650)
 Motto of the Royal Scots Dragoon Guards (active from 1971, but with a regimental antecedence back to 1678)
 Motto of the Royal Corps of Army Music (active from 1994)
 British Army Dirigible No 1, christened "Nulli Secundus", which first flew on 10 September 1907.

Affiliates 
 Motto of 379 (County of Ross) Squadron of the Air Training Corps (Alness, Highlands of Scotland)
 Motto of 58 (Harrogate) Squadron of the Air Training Corps (Central and East Yorkshire Wing)
 Part of the motto of the historical Royal Hong Kong Regiment (active 1854–1995) (Nulli Secundus in Oriente)
 Motto of 2353 (Ystrad Mynach) Squadron, No 1 Welsh Wing, Air Cadets.
 Norfolk and Suffolk Wing ATC
2425 Nottingham Airport Squadron Air Training Corps 
1947 Birstal Squadron ATC
1964 - 1966 Motto of The 201st Craft Apprentice Entry RAF Halton

Canadian Armed Forces 
 Motto of the Governor General's Horse Guards (active from 1855)
 Motto of the Canadian Grenadier Guards (active from 1859)

South African Defence Force
 Motto of the Pretoria Regiment (active from 1913)

United States Armed Forces 
 Motto of the 100th Aircraft Maintenance Squadron (100AMXS), 100th Air Refueling Wing, RAF Mildenhall, UK, United States Air Force
 Motto of naval destroyer USS Cowell (DD-547) (in service 1943–1971)
 Motto of the 68th Airlift Squadron (active 1943–1946; 1947–1952; 1955–present), 433d Airlift Wing (active 1949–1952; 1955–present), Lackland AFB, TX, United States Air Force
 Motto of 2nd Marine Air Wing (active from 1941), Marine Aviation Logistics Squadron 14, Marine Aircraft Group 14, Cherry Point, NC. USA
 Motto of the 52nd Combat Communications Squadron, Robins AFB, GA, United States Air Force

Affiliates
 Motto of the United States Air Force Academy, Class of 1960
 Public motto of the Sigma Nu undergraduate fraternity of the Virginia Military Institute

Other
 Motto of  Wallacia Rural Fire Brigade, New South Wales Rural Fire Service, Australia
 Motto of the British Triumph Owners Motor Cycle Club (founded 1949)
 Motto of the 2nd Battalion, Singapore Infantry Regiment (2SIR)
 Motto for the Valley Hockey Club Brisbane, Australia. 
 Motto for Wendes Artillery Regiment, Sweden (1794-2000)